Mulroney is a surname of Irish origin. Notable people with the surname include:

Mulroney family
Brian Mulroney (born 1939), Progressive Conservative Prime Minister of Canada 1984–1993
Mila Mulroney (born 1953), wife of Brian Mulroney
Caroline Mulroney (born 1974), daughter of Brian Mulroney; Canadian lawyer and political candidate
Ben Mulroney (born 1976), son of Brian Mulroney; Canadian television host
Dermot Mulroney (born 1963), American actor
Kieran Mulroney (born 1965), American television actor and musician

See also
Mulrooney
Maroney

Surnames of Irish origin